Victor Stepanovych Polishchuk is a prominent Ukrainian businessman in retail electronics, and owner of the electronics retailer Technopolis.  In 2013, Polishchuck purchased Eldorado, another electronics retailer, and stated that the two companies would be merged under the Eldorado brand.  Polishchuck also owns the "Gulliver" retail and office center in Kiev, and has been involved in real estate development.

References

Ukrainian businesspeople in retailing
1976 births
Living people
People from Kirovohrad Oblast
National University of Food Technologies alumni